Carole Marie Byard (July 22, 1941 – January 11, 2017) was an American visual artist, illustrator, and photographer. She was an award-winning illustrator of children's books, and the recipient of a Caldecott Honor, as well as multiple Coretta Scott King Awards.

Early life and education 
Byard was born in Atlantic City, New Jersey, to parents William "Bunny" Byard and Viola London-Byard. She had one sibling, an older brother, Michael Byard, who among other jobs, was a passionate gardener.

In 1943, Byard's mother died when she was very young, and her large extended family became very important to her. Around that same time, her father was drafted in World War II. Byard was raised by her father and grandmother after her mother's death.

Byard's father's family came from a Southern African-American tradition, and her paternal grandmother lived with them. Her father took over the role as head of the family when Byard's grandfather died. Her mother's family was from the Caribbean, from Barbados and Grenada – her mother was born on an island called Balboa in Panama while her grandfather worked building the Panama Canal.

Byard attended New Jersey Avenue School, then Central Junior High and then graduated from Atlantic City High School. Byard credits high school teacher Priscilla Gerard as an early motivator who taught her about the seriousness of art. Byard got a four-year scholarship to an art school in Ohio, but couldn't afford to go due to the death of someone close to her and her father's becoming ill with cancer.

Byard instead began working as a simulation pilot at the National Aviation Facilities Experimental Center near Atlantic City. She used this job to support herself while studying at Fleischer Art Memorial in Philadelphia from 1961 until 1963.

Her mother's youngest sister Millicent lived in New York City, so after working and helping her father, Byard was able to go and live with her. From 1964 to 1968, Byard attended New York Phoenix School of Design at 33rd and Lexington, where she majored in illustration, and where she would later go on to teach. Byard also studied lithography with H. Morimoto and Robert Blackburn.

Career 
Byard said that as she was growing up she was passionate about reading, and loved books, but always felt that there were no books or images of people that looked like her, her family, and extended family, and how they lived as people.

During college, there were very few black students. In an effort to connect with other Black artists, Byard went to the 1971 Where We At exhibition in the village called Where We At: Black Women Artists: 1971, and was able to connect with other Black women artists like Faith Ringgold. She became a part of the group.

In 1969 or 1970, Byard moved from Harlem into the Westbeth Artists Community two years after graduating from college. At Westbeth her neighbors included Freddie Waits and his son Nasheet Waits. At Westbeth, there was a Black Artists Guild that Byard said was formative. The Black Artists Guild that was initially a theater group founded in 1970. Byard went to see a production of Slave Ship, a play written by Amiri Baraka produced at Brooklyn Academy of Music. The play involved audience participation and singing. She was inspired by a character in the play and did a large painting based on the play. It turned out that many cast members also lived in Westbeth, and were part of this organization, based on Malcolm X's material left from Organization of Afro-American Unity, using the seven principles. Byard joined the group and participated in writing and making art.

Byard defined herself as a community artist, and this particular focus may have led to her lack of wider recognition and commercial success.

Illustration 
After finishing art school, Byard found work as a magazine illustration artist before shifting her focus to children's books. Her interest in performing arts led to one of her first book projects, a biography of ballet dancer Arthur Mitchell, who founded the Dance Theater of Harlem.

In 1972, she received a Ford Foundation grant that funded three months of travel in Africa. She visited Senegal, Ghana, Ethiopia, Nigeria, and Egypt. In Ibadan, Nigeria, she painted a mural at the House of Light Temple. Byard returned to Nigeria as a delegate to the second Black and African Festival of Art and Culture (FESTAC) in Lagos in 1977. Her travel experiences informed the charcoal illustrations for her next children's book, Three African Tales by Adjai Robinson.

Byard went on to illustrate more than 16 children's books over the course of her career. Her work often focused on the African-American experience and on stories of African heritage. She was concerned with increasing the representation of people of color in American children's books, and her illustrations reflect that interest in centering Black stories. In The Black Snowman (1991), Byard used pastels to illustrate a fantastical story in which a boy brings a black snowman to life using city snow and a magical kente cloth. She was a contributing artist for the children's anthology Jump Back, Honey: The Poems of Paul Laurence Dunbar (1999), which also featured artwork by Jerry Pinkney and Faith Ringgold.

Working Cotton told a story, based on Williams's own childhood experiences, about a family of African-American migrant workers in the San Joaquin Valley in California. As part of her research for Working Cotton, Byard's brother helped her learn about cotton.

Fine art 
Byard had a lifelong fine-art practice in painting, sculpture, installation and mixed-media art. She was part of the Black Arts Movement, a founding member of the Black Artists Guild and an early member of Where We At: Black Women Artists Inc. (WWA), a collective that grew out of a groundbreaking 1971 show called "Where We At: Black Women Artists, 1971."

Her earth art installations had reference points in vernacular front-yard decorations and traditional African-American burial sites. One example of such outdoor installations is Praisesong for Charles (1988), which was originally shown in Baltimore. In 1990, her work was exhibited in a group show called Chaney, Goodwin and Schwerner, the Mississippi Three: The Struggle Continues at the SoHo 20 Gallery in New York City. In 1992 she collaborated with Clarissa Sligh on an environmental, mixed-media "portrait" of Malcolm X for the Walker Art Center in Minneapolis.

Byard was a participant in the 1998 Smithsonian exhibit Resonant Forms: Contemporary African American Women Sculptors, curated by Deborah Willis. The piece she showed, titled "Imani, the Seventh Day" (1993), was an installation featuring a chair with a ladderlike back and gourds (which she had grown herself) hanging off it, standing in a tray filled with black eyed peas and pennies. On the chair's seat were corn kernels and red and green candles.

Over the course of her career, Byard also taught art at the Studio Museum in Harlem, Metropolitan Museum of Art, New York Foundation for the Arts, Baltimore School for the Arts, Maryland Institute College of Art, and Parsons School of Design.

Rent Series 
The New York Public Library exhibited a collection of Byard's art known as the Rent Series in 2015. The artworks in the series, which she began painting in the 1980s, were inspired by boxes of rent receipts she found in her father's home after his death. Byard used the series to express the personal aspects of this discovery – the reality of her father's struggle to provide a home for his family – while weaving in larger themes related to African-American history and housing segregation. The paintings were loaned for the exhibition from the collection of her friend Alexis De Veaux.

Other work 
During the 1970s, Byard also designed album covers for Strata-East Records, a New York City jazz label. Her drawings and collages were featured on album jackets for Stanley Cowell, Charles Sullivan, Sonny Fortune, Milton Marsh, The Piano Choir, and the Heath Brothers.

Honors and awards 
 1972: Ford Foundation travel grant for three months of travel in Africa
 1977: Black and African Festival of Art and Culture (FESTAC), Delegate (Lagos)
 1978: Coretta Scott King Illustrator Award for Africa Dream
 1980: Coretta Scott King Illustrator Award for Cornrows
 1981: Coretta Scott King Illustrator Award for Grandma's Joy
 1986: National Endowment for the Arts, Fellowship for drawing
 1993: Coretta Scott King Illustrator Award for Working Cotton
 1993: Caldecott Honor for Working Cotton
 1993: Coretta Scott King Award for Working Cotton
 1994: National Endowment for the Arts, Fellowship for sculpture

Discography 
 1974: Genesis by Charles Sullivan (Strata-East) – Layout & Design
 1974: Long Before Our Mothers Cried by Sonny Fortune (Strata-East) – Cover Artist/Designer
 1974: Musa – Ancestral Streams by Stanley Cowell (Strata-East) – Artist-Designer
 1975: Monism by Milton Marsh (Strata-East) – Graphics
 1975: The Piano Choir by Handscapes 2 (Strata-East) – Art direction/design
 1976: Regeneration by Stanley Cowell (Strata-East) – Cover art & design
 1976: Marchin' On! by The Heath Brothers (Strata-East) – Graphic artist
 2003: Continuum by Sonny Fortune (Sound Reason) – Cover art

Selected exhibitions

Selected group exhibitions 
 1975: Sojourn: An Exhibition of Paintings and Sculpture, Carole Byard and Valerie Maynard, Gallery 1199 (New York, NY) – March 18 – June 5, 1975
 1978: Migrations: A National Exhibition of African-American Printmakers, Gallery of Art, College of Fine Arts, Howard University (Washington, D.C.) – Aug. 28 – September 23, 1978 
 1980: The Child: Paintings, Drawings, Sculpture, Gallery 62 (New York, NY)
 1989: War, Peace and Victory: A Sculpture Exhibition in Memorial Arch, Grand Army Plaza, Prospect Park, Brooklyn, Prospect Park Alliance (New York, NY) – April 29 – June 17, 1989
 1998: Resonant Forms: Contemporary African American Women Sculptors, Smithsonian Institution (Washington, D.C.)
 1990: Dia De Los Muertos III: Homelessness, The Alternative Museum (New York, NY) – November 2–December 15, 1990
 1990–1992: Ancestors Known and Unknown: Box Work – Traveling exhibition held at Art in General, New York, February 1990; Islip Art Museum, March 1991; Barnes-Blackman Gallery Community Artists' Collective and The Firehouse Gallery, Houston, April 1991; Wooster College Museum, Sept. 1991; Kean College, October 1991; Women and their work, Austin, June 1992
 1992–1993: Malcolm X: Man, Ideal, Icon, Walker Art Center (Minneapolis, MN) – December 1992–April 1993
 1993: Through Sisters' Eyes: Children's Books Illustrated by African-American Women Artists, National Museum of Women in the Arts, Newark Museum (Newark, NJ)
 2017: We Wanted a Revolution: Black Radical Women, 1965–85, Brooklyn Museum (Brooklyn, NY)

Selected solo exhibitions 
 1993: Sculpture Installation by Carole Byard, Dana Gallery at the Phillips Museum of Art at Franklin & Marshall College (Lancaster, PA) – January 21–February 14, 1993
 2015: Rent Series, New York Public Library (New York, NY)

Selected works and publications 
 
 
 
 
 
 
 
 
 
  – Catalog of an exhibition held at Gallery 62 from December 3, 1979, to January 11, 1980
 
 
  – Traveling exhibition from February 1990 to June 1992

References

Further reading

External links 
 Carole M. Byard (artist file) at Museum of Modern Art
 Carole Byard at CUNY Graduate Center's Activist Women's Voices oral history project – finding aid
 Carole Byard at Westbeth Artists Community In Memoriam https://westbeth.org/in-memoriam/

1941 births
2017 deaths
American women illustrators
African-American women artists
American children's book illustrators
Atlantic City High School alumni
People from Atlantic City, New Jersey
Photographers from New Jersey
20th-century American photographers
21st-century American photographers
20th-century American women photographers
21st-century American women photographers
20th-century African-American women
20th-century African-American people
20th-century African-American artists
21st-century African-American women
21st-century African-American artists